The Encampment mansion is one of the 28 mansions of the Chinese constellations. It is one of the northern mansions of the Black Tortoise.

Asterisms

References 

Chinese constellations